'Sticky keys' is an accessibility feature of some graphical user interfaces which assists users who have physical disabilities or help users reduce repetitive strain injury. It serializes keystrokes instead of pressing multiple keys at a time, allowing the user to press and release a modifier key, such as Shift, Ctrl, Alt, or the Windows key, and have it remain active until any other key is pressed.

Sticky keys functionality is available on/in Microsoft Windows, macOS and chromeOS as Sticky Keys, and on Unix/X11 systems as part of the AccessX utility.

History 
Sticky Keys was first introduced to System 6 as part of the Easy Access extension, which also included mouse keys functionality.

In 1994, Solaris 2.4 shipped with the AccessX utility, which also provided sticky keys and mouse keys functionality.

See also
 Mouse keys
 Slow keys

References

Computer accessibility
User interface techniques
Ergonomics